Firuzabad Rural District is a rural district (dehestan) in Firuzabad District, Selseleh County, Lorestan Province, Iran. At the 2006 census, its population was 11,503, in 2,390 families.  The rural district has 42 villages.

References 

Rural Districts of Lorestan Province
Selseleh County